Calhoun County is a county located in the U.S. state of Mississippi. As of the 2020 census, the population was 13,266. Its county seat is Pittsboro. The county is named after John C. Calhoun, the U.S. Vice President and U.S. Senator from South Carolina.

Geography

Adjacent counties
 Lafayette County (north)
 Pontotoc County (northeast)
 Chickasaw County (east)
 Webster County (south)
 Grenada County (southwest)
 Yalobusha County (west)

Transportation

Major highways
  Mississippi Highway 8
  Mississippi Highway 9
  Mississippi Highway 32
  Mississippi Highway 9W

Airport
The Calhoun County Airport is a county-owned public-use airport located one nautical mile (1.2 mi, 1.9 km) southwest of the central business district of Pittsboro, Mississippi.

Demographics

2020 census

As of the 2020 United States Census, there were 13,266 people, 5,846 households, and 3,752 families residing in the county.

2000 census
As of the census of 2000, there were 15,069 people, 6,019 households, and 4,255 families residing in the county.  The population density was 26 people per square mile (10/km2).  There were 6,902 housing units at an average density of 12 per square mile (5/km2).  The racial makeup of the county was 69.41% White or Caucasian, 28.65% Black or African American, 0.13% Native American, 0.06% Asian, 0.03% Pacific Islander, 1.11% from other races, and 0.59% from two or more races.  2.11% of the population were Hispanic or Latino of any race.

According to the census of 2000, the largest ancestry groups in Calhoun County were English 64.4%, African 29% and Scots-Irish 4.5%

There were 6,019 households, out of which 31.60% had children under the age of 18 living with them, 51.00% were married couples living together, 15.40% had a female householder with no husband present, and 29.30% were non-families. 27.10% of all households were made up of individuals, and 13.90% had someone living alone who was 65 years of age or older.  The average household size was 2.46 and the average family size was 2.97.

In the county, the population was spread out, with 25.20% under the age of 18, 8.40% from 18 to 24, 27.00% from 25 to 44, 22.70% from 45 to 64, and 16.70% who were 65 years of age or older.  The median age was 37 years. For every 100 females there were 90.70 males.  For every 100 females age 18 and over, there were 87.00 males.

The median income for a household in the county was $27,113, and the median income for a family was $34,407. Males had a median income of $26,458 versus $19,491 for females. The per capita income for the county was $15,106.  About 14.90% of families and 18.10% of the population were below the poverty line, including 24.20% of those under age 18 and 21.80% of those age 65 or over.

Education
In addition to the public high schools of Bruce, Calhoun City, and Vardaman, Calhoun Academy is a small K-12 private school which was founded as a segregation academy, located between Pittsboro and Calhoun City.  This private school serves Calhoun and the surrounding counties. Calhoun academy's sports mascot is the cougar; Bruce's mascot is a Trojan; Calhoun City's mascot is a wildcat; and Vardaman's mascot is a ram.

Communities

Towns
 Bruce
 Calhoun City
 Derma
 Vardaman

Villages
 Big Creek
 Pittsboro (county seat)
 Slate Springs

Unincorporated communities

 Banner
 Bently
 Dentontown
 Ellard
 Hollis
 Loyd
 Reid
 Sabougla
 Sarepta
 Skuna

Ghost towns
 Hopewell
 Old Town

Politics

See also
 Dry counties
 National Register of Historic Places listings in Calhoun County, Mississippi

Footnotes

Further reading
 Leon Burgess, M.D.L. Stephens and Calhoun County, Mississippi. Carrollton, MS: Pioneer Publishing Co., 1998.
 Calhoun County Historical and Genealogical Society, Calhoun County Mississippi: A Pictorial History. Humboldt, TN: Rose Publishing Company, 1997.
 Ken Nail, History of Calhoun County. n.c.: Calhoun County School District, 1975.
  J.S. Ryan and Thomas Martin Murphree, History of Calhoun County, Mississippi. Pittsboro, MS: Calhoun Monitor, 1904.
 David G. Sansing, A History of Calhoun County, Mississippi. MA thesis. Mississippi College, 1959.

 
Mississippi counties
Counties of Appalachia
1852 establishments in Mississippi
Populated places established in 1852